Kristianstads Sim- & Livräddningssällskap / Kristianstads SLS is a swimming association in Kristianstad.

History 
KSLS was founded in 1928 and from the beginning they swam outdoors in Helge Å.Kristianstads SLS was for several years in the 1970s and 1980s Sweden's most successful swimming association. It was under the leadership of Tommy Malmsten, swimmer and in the 1980s coach of the national team that the successes were won.

The first swimmer in the national elite was Eva Folkesson, who won 7 Swedish Championship gold medals in backstroke 100m and 200m. The next swimmer in the Swedish elite was named Else Gunsten and she was a long-distance swimmer with five Swedish Championship gold medals in the 800 m freestyle in the early 70s.

One of the big stars was Eva-Marie Håkansson, a breaststroke swimmer who participated in the Olympics in 1980 and 1984. Her main success was a bronze medal at the European Championships in 1977. Tommy Malmsten now runs a very successful company in the swimming industry in Åhus. Another of the big stars was Ann-Sofi Carlsson (Roos) who swam breaststroke and individual medley. She won 24 individual Swedish Championship medals 1975–1980. Kristianstads SLS won 78 Swedish Championship titles that in ladies competition until 1985. A låter  successful swimmer was Maria Kardum who won Swedish Championship gold in the 100m freestyle and 200m medley. She also participated in the 1984 Olympics in Los Angeles. On the men's side, they have won fewer, but still about twenty Swedish Championship golds.

References 

Swimming clubs in Sweden
Sport in Skåne County
Sport in Kristianstad Municipality